"When Liking Turns To Loving" is a 1966 hit song recorded by pop singer Ronnie Dove.

Background
The song was Dove's eighth charting single.  Kenny Young wrote the song and it was released in early 1966 as D-195.  After just three albums, Diamond Records released "The Best Of Ronnie Dove" and included "When Liking Turns To Loving" as the closing track.  The song made the Top 20 on the Billboard Hot 100 and Top 10 on Billboard's Easy Listening chart.

Chart performance

Cover Versions 
Country singer Bill Anderson (singer) covered the song on his "I Love You Drops" album, released by Decca Records.

References

1965 singles
Ronnie Dove songs
1965 songs
Songs written by Kenny Young